Ayahuasca is the sixth album by drone rock band Pelt. It was released on June 12, 2001, through VHF Records.

Track listing

Personnel 
Pelt
Patrick Best – vocals, guitar, tanpura, Tibetan Bowl, chord organ, concertina
Mike Gangloff – vocals, banjo, esraj, hurdy-gurdy, zither, dolceola, tanpura
Jack Rose – guitar, chord organ
Production and additional personnel
Jason Bill – cymbal on "Raga Called John (Part 1)"
Ian Nagoski – guitar on "Deep Sunny South", tanpura on "Raga Called John (Part 1)", vocals and fiddle on "Will You Pray for Me?"

References 

2001 albums
Pelt (band) albums
VHF Records albums